Nuno I (1025–1027) was a medieval Galician bishop.

References 
 Episcopologio Mindoniense. CAL PARDO, Enrique, 2003, .

External links 

  Official web site of the Diocese of Mondoñedo-Ferrol

Clergy from Galicia (Spain)
11th-century Roman Catholic bishops in Spain
1025 births
1027 deaths